Kalenborn may refer to the following places in Rhineland-Palatinate, Germany:

Kalenborn, Ahrweiler, in the district of Ahrweiler
Kalenborn, Cochem-Zell, in the district of Cochem-Zell
Kalenborn-Scheuern, in the district of Vulkaneifel